Qaleh-ye Mozal (also Romanized as Qal‘eh-ye Moz‘al; also known as Moz‘al and Qal‘eh-ye Moḩammad Reẕā Khān) is a village in Javanmardi Rural District, Khanmirza District, Lordegan County, Chaharmahal and Bakhtiari Province, Iran. At the 2006 census, its population was 80, in 12 families. The village is populated by Lurs.

References 

Populated places in Lordegan County
Luri settlements in Chaharmahal and Bakhtiari Province